The 2020 Oklahoma Sooners football team represented the University of Oklahoma during the 2020 NCAA Division I FBS football season, the 126th season for the  Oklahoma Sooners. The team was led by Lincoln Riley, in his fourth year as head coach. They played their home games at Gaylord Family Oklahoma Memorial Stadium in Norman, Oklahoma. They are a charter member of the Big 12 Conference.

Previous season
The Sooners finished the 2019 season 12–1, 8–1 in Big 12 play. Tied for the best record in conference play, the Sooners clinched a berth in the conference championship game where they defeated Baylor 30–23 in overtime to win their 13th Big 12 Championship. Oklahoma was selected as the fourth seed to play in the 2019 College Football playoff against first seed LSU in the 2019 Peach Bowl, where they lost 28–63.

Offseason

Position key

Offseason departures

Recruiting

Transfers

Outgoing

Incoming

Returning starters

2020 NFL Draft

NFL Combine

The official list of participants for the 2020 NFL Combine included Oklahoma football players : -

Team players drafted into the NFL

Preseason

Award watch lists
Listed in the order that they were released

Big 12 media days
The Big 12 media days were held on July 21–22, 2020 in a virtual format due to the COVID-19 pandemic.

Big 12 media poll

Preseason awards
2020 Preseason All-Big 12

Personnel

Roster

Coaching staff

Depth chart

Schedule

Spring Game

The 2020 Oklahoma Spring Game was set to take place on April 18, 2020, but was canceled on March 18, 2020 due to the COVID-19 pandemic.

Regular season
Oklahoma announced a revised 2020 football schedule on August 12, 2020, The 2020 schedule consists of 5 home games, 4 away games and 1 neutral-site game in the regular season. The Sooners will host 1 non-conference game against Missouri State. Oklahoma will host Baylor, Oklahoma State in the Bedlam Series, Kansas, Kansas State, and travel to Iowa State, TCU, Texas Tech, and West Virginia in regular-season conference play. Oklahoma will play Texas in Dallas, Texas at the Cotton Bowl Stadium on October 10 in the Red River Showdown, the 115th game played in the series.

The Sooners had games scheduled against Army, Tennessee and West Virginia, which were canceled due to the COVID-19 pandemic.

Game summaries

vs. Missouri State

vs. Kansas State

at Iowa State

vs. No. 22 Texas

at TCU

at Texas Tech

vs. Kansas

vs. No. 14 Oklahoma State

vs. Baylor

2020 Big XII Championship vs. No. 6 Iowa State

vs No. 7 Florida (Cotton Bowl)

Statistics

Scoring

Scores by quarter (non-conference opponents)

Scores by quarter (Big 12 opponents)

Scores by quarter (All opponents)

Rankings

Players drafted into the NFL

Postseason

Bowl game

Notes

References

Oklahoma
Oklahoma Sooners football seasons
Big 12 Conference football champion seasons
Cotton Bowl Classic champion seasons
Oklahoma Sooners football